Community Against Pollution aka Citizens Against Pollution or (CAP) is an organization formed by the residents of Anniston, Alabama, in response to the effects of pollution.

Background
During a period of around 36 years from 1935 to 1971, there were about  five million pounds of PCBs produced and released. These ended up in landfill sites in the area, and around one million pounds contaminated local waterways and was embedded in sediments. The resident's health was also affected.

In 1998 David Baker founded CAP. With the organization's support residents sued chemical giant Monsanto over their health problems brought about by the company's pollution.

In 2002 Anniston was featured in an episode of 60 minutes; it was stated in the programme that the city was one of the most toxic in America.

Action
As a result of CAP's efforts a lawsuit in Alabama was brought against Monsanto.

References

Environmental organizations based in the United States
Environment of Alabama
Anniston, Alabama
Organizations based in Alabama
Environmental organizations established in 1998